Bamethan is a vasodilator.

References

Phenols
Phenylethanolamines
Vasodilators